William Y. Brown (born August 13, 1948) is a zoologist and attorney, currently the chief environmental officer of the Bureau of Ocean Energy Management in the Department of the Interior. He is a former nonresident senior fellow at the Brookings Institution, a former science advisor to U.S. Secretary of the Interior Bruce Babbitt, a former president of the Bishop Museum in Hawaii, a former president of the Academy of Natural Sciences in Philadelphia, Pennsylvania, and a former president of the Woods Hole Research Center in Falmouth, Massachusetts. He is the author of the novels "Valley of the Scorpion" and "Ruffner's Cave".

Biography
Brown was born in Artesia, California, on August 13, 1948, and graduated from high school in Brazil at the Escola Americana do Recife. He later graduated from the University of Virginia (BA 1969, Biology, with highest distinction), Johns Hopkins University (MAT, 1970), the University of Hawaiʻi where he was a NSF Fellow (PhD, 1973, Zoology), and Harvard Law School (JD, 1977).

Professional life
From 1973 to 1974, Brown was assistant biological of professor sciences at Mount Holyoke College in Massachusetts. During law school, he held summer and consulting positions with the Environmental Protection Agency (1974), Council on Environmental Quality (1975), and the Department of the Interior (1976–77).

In 1977, Brown was appointed executive secretary of the U.S. Endangered Species Scientific Authority, overseeing treaty commitments for wildlife trade. In 1980, he was appointed executive secretary of the International Convention Advisory Commission, with similar responsibilities. Brown left government in 1981 with change in administration, joining the Environmental Defense Fund where he served as senior scientist and attorney and acting executive director until 1985. He played a key role in developing and protecting from repeal key provisions of the Endangered Species Act.

In 1985, Brown joined Waste Management, Inc. and was vice president for environmental planning and programs and the first chairman of the firm's executive environmental committee. Brown left WMI in October 1994 and worked as a consultant, first with Hagler Bailly Consulting as a principal and later with the World Wildlife Fund as a senior fellow.

Brown served with U.S. Secretary of the Interior Bruce Babbitt as science advisor from April 1997 until January 2001. There, he advocated, wrote and negotiated executive orders for coral reef protection and invasive species management issued by President William Clinton and orders of Secretary Bruce Babbitt establishing marine national wildlife refuges for Navassa Island off Haiti and Palmyra Atoll and Kingman Reef south of Hawaii.

On leaving government with a change in administration, he served as vice president for oceans and science policy at the National Audubon Society before being recruited by the Bishop Museum, where he served as president and CEO from October 2001 to January 2007. He is credited with stabilizing the museum both financially and politically, improving attendance and successfully undertaking several expansions and renovations. He served as president and CEO of the Academy of Natural Sciences from February 2007 to January 2010. He served as president and CEO of the Woods Hole Research Center from February 2010 to January 2011. He was a nonresident senior fellow at the Brookings Institution from June 2011 until November 2013, when he was appointed the chief environmental officer of the Bureau of Ocean Energy Management.

Affiliations
William Brown is a member of Phi Beta Kappa, Sigma Xi, Phi Sigma, and a fellow of the College of Physicians of Philadelphia. He is a former member of the oversight advisory committee for the Division on Earth and Life Studies of the National Academies. He is a former president and director of the Natural Science Collections Alliance and a former chairman and director of the Global Heritage Fund and of the Ocean Conservancy. He is a former director of various other boards, including the Wistar Institute, Environmental Law Institute, Environmental and Energy Study Institute, U.S. Environmental Training Institute, Audubon Naturalist Society, Friends of the United Nations Environmental Programme, and the Harvard Environmental Law Society. He is a member of the District of Columbia Bar.

Selected non-fiction published works
2021 "Using Science to Safely Tap Energy and Minerals from the Sea: role of the US Bureau of Ocean Energy Management." In Preparing a Workforce for the New Blue Economy: People, Products and Policies. Edited by Liesl Hotaling and Richard W. Spinrad. Chapter 10. Elsevier Press. 2021.
2014 " "A Green Growth Path." In "Kazakhstan 2050: Toward a Modern Society for All." Edited by A. Aitzhanov, S. Katsu, J.F. Linn, and V. Yezhov. Oxford University Press, February.
2013  "Wanted: A Noah's Ark for Species' Preservation", The Wall Street Journal. Op-Ed. March 23.
2013 "DNA Net Earth" The Brookings Institution. Policy Paper 2013–01. March.
2013 "The Climate Scientist and the Pipeline" Letter to the editor. The New York Times. March 8. 
2012 "Genetically Modified Food" Letter to the editor. The New York Times. September 23.
2012: "Natural Capital Resources. In: Rio+20: Coalitions Driving Bottom Up Change" The Brookings Institution. June.
2012: "Preserving Species"  Letter to the editor. The New York Times. June 4.
2012: "Aquaculture Priorities: Expansion in Africa and Standards for Global Sustainability" The Brookings Institution. February 13.
2012: "Limits to Climate Change Mitigation and the Adaptation Imperative" The Brookings Institution.  February 7.
2011: "Keep the U.S. Flag Raised at UNESCO" The Brookings Institution. December 12.
2011: "Looking at Obama's Record on the Environment" Letter to the editor. The New York Times. November 16.
2011: "Heritage, Democracy, and Development in Libya" The Brookings Institution.  November 8.
2011: "Playing to Win on Climate Change" The Brookings Institution. October 19.
2011: "Principles for Water and Development" The Brookings Institution. October 7.
2011: "Cultural Heritage and Development" The Brookings Institution. September 14.
2011: "Questions About Gene-Modified Foods" Letter to the editor. The New York Times. August 24.
2011: "Correspondence: Invest in a DNA bank for all species" Nature pages 476, 399. August 24.
2011: "High Seas Biodiversity" The Brookings Institution. August 19.
2011: "Global Environmental Quality: Rio+20 and Beyond" The Brookings Institution. August 8.
2011: "Conserving Biological Diversity" Global Views. The Brookings Institution. July.
2011: "It's Time for a New Biotechnology Law" The Brookings Institution. July 27.
 2011: "Keeping Sea Life" The Brookings Institution.  July 20.
2011: "Rules to Stop Overfishing" Letter to the editor. The New York Times. June 20.
2011: "What to Do About Invasive Species"  Letter to the editor. The New York Times. April 10.
2010: "Keepers of the Codes of Life" Op Ed. GlobalPost. April 22.
2006: "Sanctuary a victory long in making" Op Ed. The Honolulu Advertiser. June 18.
2004: "Bishop Museum Final Guidance for the Native American Graves Protection and Repatriation Act of 1990" Bishop Museum. October 7.
2004: "Bishop Museum Interim Guidance for the Native American Graves Protection and Repatriation Act of 1990"  Bishop Museum. June 30.
2001: "Promise and Peril: Biotechnology's Potential for Environmental Quality."  Environmental Forum, September/October 2001, Volume 8, Number 5.
2000: Concluding address "The Way Forward." Conference on Best Management Practices for Preventing and Controlling Invasive Alien Species. Cape Town, South Africa. February 22.  Symposium Proceedings: 285–6.  Working for Water Programme, Cape Town, South Africa.
1995. "Corporate Programs to Understand and Conserve Biological Diversity." Report of the National Biological Service, Department of the Interior.
1995: "Science and the Endangered Species Act" W.Y. Brown and other members of the National Research Council Committee on Scientific Issues in the Endangered Species Act. National Academy Press.
1993: "Corporate Leadership." In: Joyce K. Berry and John C. Gordon. (eds.) Environmental Leadership: Developing Effective Skills and Styles. Island Press.
1991. "Environmental Leadership: The Search for Priorities and Power." Environmental Law: Volume 21, Number 4. Northwestern School of Law of Lewis and Clark College.
1990. "Waste Reduction: Policy and Practice."  W.Y. Brown, Waste Management, Inc. and Mary Edgar, Piper & Marbury. John Wiley and Sons.
1985. "Eliminating Tax Subsidies to Protect Critical Habitat for Endangered Species and Other Natural Areas:  A Report and Model Legislation." Printed in the report of U.S. Senate Hearing 99-711, pages 291-323. Environmental Defense Fund. February 4.
1984. "Arctic Environmental Quality." Chapter 9. In:  W.E. Westermeyer and K.M. Shusterich, (Eds.) United States Arctic Interests. Springer-Verlag: New York.
1981. "Acid Rain and Wildlife Conservation." Cong. Record, October 6, 1981, Senate, page 23268.
1977. "Export of bobcat, lynx, river otter, and american ginseng: preliminary findings and request for comment. Endangered Species Scientific Authority." 42 Federal Register pages 43729-43767. August 30.
1977. *Responsibilities of the Endangered Species Scientific Authority." Proc. Ann. Conf. S.E. Assoc. Fish & Wildlife Agencies 32:853-854.
1976. "The breeding of sooty terns and brown noddies on Manana Island, Hawaii."  Condor 78: pages 61–66.
1975. "Parental feeding of young sooty terns (Sterna fuscata (L)) and brown noddies (Anous stolidus (L)) in Hawaii." J. Animal Ecology 44: pages 731-742.

See also
Academy of Natural Sciences
Bernice P. Bishop Museum
Brookings Institution
Bureau of Ocean Energy Management
Endangered Species Act
Global Heritage Fund
United States National Academies
United States Pacific Island Wildlife Refuges

References

National Academies of Sciences, Engineering, Medicine. "Attributes of a First-in-Class Environmental Program: A Letter Report Prepared for the Bureau of Ocean Energy Management" The National Academies Press. 2022 
Butler, Declan "Revolution offers chance for Libyan archaeology" Nature News November 18, 2011 
Goldenberg, Suzanne "Rio+20 summit co-ordinator seeks to put agriculture centre stage" The Guardian September 2, 2011 
Williams, Wendy "An expert applies science to policy", Providence Journal, March 15, 2010 
Hurdle, Jon, "Philadelphia Set to Honor Darwin", The New York Times, June 23, 2008 
Bauers, Sandy, "Rock on: Academy won't sell collection", Philadelphia Inquirer, June 16, 2007 
Hoover, Will, "Bishop Museum goes headhunting", Honolulu Advertiser, January 2, 2007
McDermott, John, "Bishop Museum will work its magic on musty Hawaiian Hall.", Pacific Business News, August 25, 2006 
McDermott, John, "High-energy team has Bishop Museum on a roll.", Pacific Business News, August 25, 2006 
Pala, Christopher, "A Struggle to Preserve a Hawaiian Archipelago and Its Varied Wildlife." New York Times December 19, 2006 
Pala, Christopher, "Paradise Almost Lost: Hawaii's Bishop Grapples with NAGPRA" Museum March/April 2008 
Friedman, Thomas, "Foreign Affairs: Mr. Toad's Last Ride.", The New York Times, June 6, 1998.
Shabecoff, Philip, "Irate and Afraid, Poor Nations Fight Efforts to Use Them as Toxic Dumps", The New York Times, July 5, 1988 
Shabecoff, Philip, "Army Corps of Engineers Proposes to Ease Law Protecting Wetlands", The New York Times, March 26, 1983 
Rensberger, Boyce, "U.S. Is Pressed to Comply With Wildlife Protection Treaty", The New York Times, June 20, 1978 
U.S. Fish and Wildlife Service , "Endangered Species Scientific Authority Gets First Executive Secretary and Charter" August 5, 1977

1948 births
Living people
American conservationists
Directors of museums in the United States
American nonprofit executives
Harvard Law School alumni
Johns Hopkins University alumni
University of Virginia alumni
University of Hawaiʻi at Mānoa alumni
People from Artesia, California
Activists from California
Mount Holyoke College faculty